This list of video game museums shows video game museums in the world.

Video game museums

Online video game museums

See also
 List of museums
 Video game
 List of computer museums

References

External links
 Internet Arcade – web-based library of arcade (coin-operated) video games from the 1970s through to the 1990s
 Software Library: MS-DOS Games

Lists of museums by subject